Lisa Risby (born 6 July 1993) is a Swedish orienteering competitor who runs for the club OK Kåre.

She represented Sweden at the 2021 World Orienteering Championships in the Czech Republic, where she placed sixth in the middle distance. She won a gold medal in the women's relay with the Swedish team, along with Sara Hagström and Tove Alexandersson.

References

External links
 

1993 births
Living people
Swedish orienteers
Female orienteers
Foot orienteers
21st-century Swedish women
Junior World Orienteering Championships medalists